Madhya Pradesh State Highway 3 (MP SH 3) is a state highway running from Gwalior until Picchore via Chinor, Chimak, Bagwai, Bhitarwar, Karera, Sirsod.

The highway connects various important towns in Northern Madhya Pradesh.

See also
List of state highways in Madhya Pradesh

References

State Highways in Madhya Pradesh